Druid, in comics, may refer to:

 Druid, the surname of father and son, Marvel Comics characters:
 Doctor Druid, a Marvel Comics superhero, named Anthony Druid, who featured in a 1995 mini-series called Druid
 Druid, Doctor Druid's son Sebastian. A member of the third incarnation of the Howling Commandos
 Dredmund the Druid, a Marvel Comics supervillain

See also
Druid (disambiguation)

References